Catharanthus longifolius is a species of flowering plant in the dogbane family, Apocynaceae. It is endemic to Madagascar.

References	

longifolius
Endemic flora of Madagascar